Varndean College is a sixth form college in Brighton and Hove that serves the needs of sixth form students and adults.

Location
Varndean College is on Surrenden Road, in the northern part of Brighton. It shares the Surrenden campus with Balfour Junior School, Balfour Infants School, Dorothy Stringer School and Varndean Secondary School.

History
The college was founded in 1884 in York Place, Brighton, as a boys' secondary school and moved to its current site (overlooking the city and the sea) in 1932, later attaining grammar school status, becoming Varndean Grammar School for Boys, administered by the Education Committee for the County Borough of Brighton. In 1972 the first girls were admitted to the school (a small number of girls attended A level physics classes at the school in 1970–71), and in 1975 it became a sixth form college under its first principal, David A.G. Turner.

Former Headmasters and Principals 
Varndean Grammar School for Boys
1884–1901 Edwin H. Lethbridge (died 1932)
1902–1932 William J. Stainer (died 1937)
1932–1963 Eric J. Hutchins (died 1972)
1963–1970 John E. Mollison
1970–1975 David A.G. Turner (died 1997)
Varndean College
1975–1988 David A.G. Turner (died 1997)
1988–2006 Alan Jenkins (died March 2020)
2006–2020 Philip Harland
2020–present day Donna-Marie Janson

Notable alumni
 
The Old Varndeanian Association exists to maintain a network between former pupils and students of both the school and college, as well as former pupils of Varndean Girls' School.  The association maintains contact with thousands of Old Varndeanians and organises regular reunions and other functions.

 Alfie Deyes, youtuber
Celeste, singer
 Bobby Barry, musician
 Darius Danesh actor, singer, reality star. 
 Tommy Fraser, footballer (Brighton and Hove Albion)
 Darren Freeman, footballer (Brentford, Fulham and Brighton and Hove Albion)
 Lucy Griffiths, actress
 Natasha Kaplinsky, television presenter
 Toby MacFarlaine, rock musician
 Russell Martin, footballer (Wycombe Wanderers, Peterborough, Norwich City)
 Lisa Francesca Nand, journalist and broadcaster
 Dan and Tom Searle, twin musicians from the Brighton based band Architects
 Rebecca Stephens, musician

Varndean Grammar School for Boys

 Desmond Lynam, broadcaster
 Walter Hubert Baddeley, bishop of Melanesia, Whitby and Blackburn
 David Blanchflower, Bruce V. Rauner Professor of Economics, Dartmouth College and University of Glasgow
 Frank Bridge, composer
 David Collings, actor
 Anthony French, professor of physics 1964–1991 at the Massachusetts Institute of Technology, worked on the Manhattan Project
 Dave Greenfield, The Stranglers (keyboards) 1960–1967
 Harold Foster Hallett, philosopher
 Norman Hammond, archaeologist and archaeology correspondent of The Times since 1967
 Alan Hart, chief executive from 1985 to 1989 of the Equal Opportunities Commission
 Ralph Hone, governor of North Borneo 1949–1954
 Eric James, Baron James of Rusholme, high master of the Manchester Grammar School (1945–62) and first vice-chancellor of the University of York (1962–73)
 Steve Ovett, Olympic athlete
 Ian Ritchie, architect
 Simon Schaffer, historian
 Paul Scofield, actor
 Peter Sharpe, chief constable 1994–2000 of Hertfordshire Constabulary
 Eric Shepherd, professor of investigative, security and police sciences at the City University, London
 Martin William Wallace, bishop of Selby 2003–2013
 Mike Winch, Commonwealth Games shot-putter and national coach

References

External links
 Varndean College
 Old Varndeanian Association
 Varndean College welcomes first female headteacher (Brighton and Hove Argus)
 Varndean College appoints its first female Principal (Varndean College Official Website)
 Varndean College says goodbye to its longstanding Principal (Varndean College Official Website)

Education in Brighton and Hove
Educational institutions established in 1884
Sixth form colleges in East Sussex
1884 establishments in England